Speed Demon (James Sanders) is a supervillain appearing in American comic books published by Marvel Comics. Created by Roy Thomas and Sal Buscema, the character made his first appearance in The Avengers #69 (Oct. 1969) as a member of the Squadron Sinister known as the Whizzer.

Publication history
James Sanders first appears as the Whizzer in the final panel of The Avengers #69 (Oct. 1969), the first chapter of a three-issue storyline by writer Roy Thomas and penciller Sal Buscema. The story arc introduced the supervillain team the Squadron Sinister, whose four members were loosely based on heroes in DC Comics' Justice League of America, with the Whizzer based on the Flash.

Fictional character biography
The Squadron Sinister are created by the cosmic entity the Grandmaster to battle the champions of the time-traveling Kang – the superhero team the Avengers. The Whizzer battles Avenger Goliath, but the fight is interrupted by the Black Knight. The Avengers eventually defeat the Squadron and they in turn are abandoned by the Grandmaster. The Squadron reappear in the title Defenders, reunited by the alien Nebulon. The villains receive greater power in exchange for the planet Earth, and create a giant laser cannon in the Arctic to melt the polar ice caps, thereby covering the entirety of the Earth's surface in water. The superhero team the Defenders prevent the scheme and defeat the villains (and Nebulon), with Namor the Sub-Mariner humiliating the Whizzer.

After this defeat the Whizzer and his teammates are teleported off-world by Nebulon, returning with an energy-draining weapon. The Squadron Sinister plan to threaten the Earth again but are defeated once more by the Defenders and the Avenger Yellowjacket. The character has another brief encounter with several members of the Avengers, who seek a way to separate the power prism of Doctor Spectrum from fellow Avenger the Wasp. The Whizzer disassociates himself from the Squadron Sinister and adopts a new costume and alias, Speed Demon.

Writer Bill Mantlo and penciller Bob Hall revamped the character in the title The Amazing Spider-Man, with Sanders returning to crime with a new costume and the alias Speed Demon. The character makes a number of appearances in titles, including Marvel Team-Up against Spider-Man and Fantastic Four member the Human Torch, in The Amazing Spider-Man as a member of the criminal group the Sinister Syndicate, Marvel Tales, Quasar, and in the graphic novel Avengers: Deathtrap – The Vault (1991).

Speed Demon makes another abortive attempt to kill Spider-Man in the limited series The Deadly Foes of Spider-Man; battles the mutant Wolverine; features in Web of Spider-Man; encounters Spider-Man and the New Warriors in Spectacular Spider-Man Annual #12, Web of Spider-Man Annual #8, and The New Warriors Annual #2 (all 1992); and in the title Captain America briefly skirmishes with the hero at an A.I.M. weapons expo. After an appearance in the limited series Spider-Man: The Power of Terror, Speed Demon is employed by crime boss Justin Hammer to battle the superhero team the Thunderbolts.

Speed Demon is recruited to join the New Thunderbolts but is eventually ejected from the team by heroine Songbird for stealing money to fund the team (including from the company of former teammate Kyle Richmond, who tracks the character as Nighthawk). After a confrontation and unexpected skirmish with an apparently resurrected Hyperion and a new Doctor Spectrum (Alice Nugent, former lab assistant of Henry Pym), Speed Demon defects to join the reformed Squadron Sinister.

Courtesy of a phenomenon known as the Wellspring of Power, an interdimensional source of superhuman abilities, the Grandmaster – guiding force behind the return of the Squadron Sinister – has been increasing the Squadron Sinister's powers. He directs Speed Demon and the Squadron (now joined by Nighthawk, who wishes to stop New Thunderbolts team leader Baron Zemo) to find the main source of the Wellspring. For a time the character, deprived of the use of the Wellspring, is powerless and has his legs broken in a battle with New Thunderbolts member Joystick. Empowered in the final battle against the New Thunderbolts, Speed Demon takes advantage of the chaos caused when Zemo defeats the Grandmaster to viciously beat Joystick in retaliation for his injuries. Speed Demon and the members of the Squadron scatter and escape.

Speed Demon appeared in Brand New Day as one of the villains in the bar. He later joined the Hood's gang, and attacks Mister Negative.

As part of the Marvel NOW! event, Speed Demon appears as a member of the latest incarnation of the Sinister Six. Speed Demon features as one of the main characters in Superior Foes of Spider-Man.

Speed Demon later appears robbing a pawn shop with Man Mountain Marko when they are caught by Rage. After a brief fight, they escape while Rage gets arrested by the Americops. He is later captured by Sam Wilson, as the former Captain America, who forced him to confess of his and Marko's involvement in the pawn shop robbery.

Powers and abilities

As a result of mutagenic chemicals concocted under the Grandmaster's mental guidance, Speed Demon possesses superhuman speed, stamina, and reflexes. The character can create cyclones (by running in circles) and run up walls and across water. Speed Demon's superhumanly fast thought processes and reflexes enable him to perceive his surroundings while moving at high speeds, pick up objects, and execute complex acrobatic maneuvers.

James Sanders possesses a master's degree in chemistry.

Reception
 In 2018, CBR.com ranked Speed Demon 12th in their "25 Fastest Characters In The Marvel Universe" list.
 In 2020, CBR.com ranked Speed Demon 5th in their "10 Most Powerful Members of the Sinister Syndicate" list.
 In 2022, CBR.com ranked Speed Demon 10th in their "Marvel: The 20 Fastest Speedsters" list.

Other versions

House of M
In the House of M reality, Jim Sanders, along with Abner Jenkins, works as a biochemist for Major Josten and General Dugan. He was given a Kree blood sample in hopes of creating a bio-weapon to use against the Kree to stop their alliance with the mutants.

Marvel Zombies
In Marvel Zombies, he becomes an agent for the zombified Kingpin. He is sent with Quicksilver and the Whizzer to pursue Machine Man, who is opposing the zombie efforts. The Whizzer is flattened and the other two are shredded by a taut-wire trap.

In other media
 A variation of Speed Demon appears in Avengers Assemble, voiced by Jason Spisak. This version is an alien who destroyed his home planet alongside the Squadron Supreme and uses a speed belt to achieve his powers. He and the Squadron battle the Avengers until they are eventually defeated and incarcerated in the Vault.
 Speed Demon will appear in the Disney+ / Marvel Cinematic Universe series Spider-Man: Freshman Year (2024).

References

External links
 Speed Demon at Marvel.com
 The Squadron Supreme at Don Markstein's Toonopedia
 
 Speed Demon at Spiderfan.org

Characters created by Roy Thomas
Characters created by Sal Buscema
Comics characters introduced in 1969
Marvel Comics characters who can move at superhuman speeds
Marvel Comics mutates
Marvel Comics superheroes
Marvel Comics supervillains
Spider-Man characters